Mauricio Alejandro Viana Caamaño (born 14 June 1989) is a Brazilian-born Chilean footballer who plays as a goalkeeper for Deportes Puerto Montt.

Early life
Viana was born in São Paulo, Brazil to a Brazilian father and a Chilean mother. When he was 5, he and his mother moved to Limache, where he was raised.

Club career
On 4 August 2013, Viana was injured towards the end of a match against Audax Italiano, but played on to the end and saved a late penalty to keep the score goalless. After the match, he received emergency surgery for a perforated intestine.

International career
He was a substitute at the friendly matches of the Chile senior team against Paraguay and Peru on December 2011 and April 2012 respectively. After defeating Peru, Chile won the Copa del Pacífico.

In addition, he represented Chile in a match against Uruguay U23  played in Maldonado, Uruguay. The squad only included under-25 players and was a loss by 6–4.

Honours

Club
Santiago Wanderers
 Primera B: 2019

International
Chile
 Copa del Pacífico: 2012

References

External links
 
 
 Mauricio Viana at Football-Lineups
 

1989 births
Living people
Footballers from São Paulo
Brazilian people of Chilean descent
Citizens of Chile through descent
Naturalized citizens of Chile
Chilean people of Brazilian descent
Chilean footballers
Association football goalkeepers
Santiago Wanderers footballers
Unión Quilpué footballers
Chiapas F.C. footballers
Sporting Cristal footballers
Chilean Primera División players
Primera B de Chile players
Liga MX players
Peruvian Primera División players
Chilean expatriate footballers
Chilean expatriate sportspeople in Mexico
Expatriate footballers in Mexico
Chilean expatriate sportspeople in Peru
Expatriate footballers in Peru